Liechtenstein competed at the 2016 Winter Youth Olympics in Lillehammer, Norway from 12 to 21 February 2016. The team consisted of two male athletes in two sports (alpine skiing and bobsleigh).

Competitors

Alpine skiing

Liechtenstein qualified one boy.

Boys

Bobsleigh

Liechtenstein qualified one boy.

See also
Liechtenstein at the 2016 Summer Olympics

References

Nations at the 2016 Winter Youth Olympics
Liechtenstein at the Youth Olympics
2016 in Liechtenstein sport